The Central Flores languages (also called Ngadha–Lio) are a subgroup of the Austronesian language family. They are spoken in the central part of Flores, one of the Lesser Sunda Islands in the eastern half of Indonesia. The speech area of the Central Flores languages is bordered to the west by the Manggarai language, and to the east by the Sikka language.


Languages
The Central Flores subgroup comprises the following languages, from west to east (with subvarieties):

Rongga
Namut and Nginamanu
Ngadha (Bajawa, Central, So'a)
Kéo
Nage (Central, East)
Nga'o (West, East)
Ende
Lio

Grammar
Unlike most other Austronesian languages, the Central Flores languages are highly isolating. They completely lack derivational and inflectional morphemes, and core grammatical relations are mostly expressed by word order. E.g. in Rongga, there is strict SVO word order:  'that horse kick(ed) me'. Possession is expressed by placing the possessor after the possessed noun:  'my mother'.

Prehistory
According to McWhorter (2019), the extreme isolating character of the Central Flores languages is the result of language shift through "heavy adult acquisition", which means that adult populations which originally spoke completely different languages shifted to a language ancestral to the Central Flores languages, but dropped all derivational and inflectional morphology. This process is characteristic for the development of pidgins and creoles, most of which display strong simplification of the source language.

McWhorter's (2019) hypothesis of adult acquisition and subsequent creolization is dismissed by Elias (2020). Instead, he proposes that the isolating character can better be explained by a pre-Austronesian substrate language, which must have had the typological features of the Mekong-Mamberamo area. Elias (2020) estimates that the switch would have taken place around 2,500–1,500 BCE.

References

Languages of Indonesia
Central Malayo-Polynesian languages
Flores Island (Indonesia)